The rugby league club St Helens R.F.C. have operated a women's team since purchasing Thatto Heath Crusaders women's side in 2017 ahead of the 2018 season. They won four successive Challenge Cups from 2013 to 2016. The 2016 win formed part of their treble winning season, and are so far the only women's side to have won it. The side won the 2021 Women's Challenge Cup after beating York City Knights, adding to the four cup titles won as Thatto Heath. That season, they also completed the treble for the second time.

Seasons

Honours
Women's Super League
Grand Final
Winners (2): 2016, 2021
League Leader's Shield
Winners (2): 2016, 2021
Runners-up (2): 2017, 2019
Women's Challenge Cup 
Winners (6): 2013, 2014, 2015, 2016, 2021, 2022

See also
St Helens R.F.C.

References

St Helens R.F.C.
2013 establishments in England
Rugby clubs established in 2013
Sport in St Helens, Merseyside
Women's rugby league teams in England
Rugby league teams in Merseyside
RFL Women's Super League